The Holidays with Pay Act 1938 was legislation of the Parliament of the United Kingdom which provided for paid holidays for working class employees, and was the result of a twenty-year campaign.
The Act was repealed by the Statute Laws Repeals Act 2004.

It led to the popularity of holiday camps such as those run by Butlins

The provisions of the Act have largely been replaced by the European Working Time Directive enacted by statutory instrument 1998/1833 - Working Time Regulations 1998

References

United Kingdom Acts of Parliament 1938
Employment in the United Kingdom
Public holidays in the United Kingdom